The striped-tailed racer (Platyceps vittacaudatus) is a snake in the family Colubridae. 

It is found in India.

Distribution
India (Darjeeling, West Bengal)

Type locality: from "vicinity of Darjiling" (= Darjeeling, 27° 02'N; 88° 16'E; West Bengal State, eastern India). Known only from the type locality.

References 

Colubrids
Taxa named by Edward Blyth
Reptiles described in 1854